Mads Juhl Kikkenborg (born 7 October 1999) is a Danish professional footballer who plays as a goalkeeper for Danish Superliga club Lyngby Boldklub.

Career

Esbjerg fB
Kikkenborg is a product of Esbjerg fB, where he worked his way up through the youth ranks. In May 2019, Kikkenborg was on the bench for three Danish Superliga games, however, without making his debut. On 19 December 2019 it was confirmed, that Kikkenborg would play the rest of the 2019-20 season on loan for Danish 2nd Division club FC Sydvest 05. However, he would still train with Esbjerg, due to the geographical distance between the clubs. Kikkenborg made seven appearances for the 2nd Division team.

After returning from the loan spell, Kikkenborg became a permanent part of the first team squad. On 2 September 2020, 20-year old Kikkenborg got his official debut for Esbjerg in a Danish Cup game against Glamsbjerg IF. About two months later, on 24 October 2020, he got his Danish 1st Division debut against Hobro IK. Kikkenborg made 24 league appearances in that season. At the end of November 2020, Kikkenborg signed a new deal with Esbjerg until July 2024.

On 28 July 2021, 21 of Esbjerg's first-team players including Kikkenborg, sent an open letter to club management, expressing "strong distrust" to the clubs manager, Peter Hyballa. The letter, which was also published in several media outlets, mentions several episodes where Hyballa had physically or mentally abused players. In the wake of all the fuss, the club confirmed on 4 August 2021 that Kikkenborg had had his contract terminated by mutual agreement.

Lyngby
Five days after leaving Esbjerg - on 9 August 2021 - Danish 1st Division club Lyngby Boldklub confirmed, that Kikkenborg had joined the club on a deal until June 2024. With three strong goalkeepers in the squad, Kikkenborg had to wait until 6 November 2021 before he made his debut: it was in a league match against Hvidovre IF, which they lost 0-1. Kikkenborg was noted for just six appearances in that season, but helped the team with promotion to the 2022–23 Danish Superliga.

Kikkenborg made his debut in the highest Danish league tier on 28 August 2022 against Viborg FF.

References

External links

Mads Kikkenborg at DBU

1999 births
Living people
Danish men's footballers
Association football goalkeepers
Denmark youth international footballers
People from Esbjerg
Danish Superliga players
Danish 1st Division players
Danish 2nd Division players
Esbjerg fB players
FC Sydvest 05 players
Lyngby Boldklub players